Sankt Hans fest (St. John's Festival or Saint Hans' Celebration) is a Norwegian film directed by Toralf Sandø. It premiered on April 7, 1947. It is based on the 1887 novel Sankt Hans Fest by Alexander Kielland.

Plot
The film follows the plot of the novel. The dour priest Kruse is played by Tore Foss, who opposes the business establishment's town party, which is planned by Johannes Eckhoff as Garman, Jon Lennart Mjøen as Randulf, Claus Wiese as Holck, Erling Drangsholt as the bank manager, and Sigurd Magnussøn as the county governor. Pressure is placed on both sides by Else Heiberg, who is Randulf's wife.

Reception
A review of the film was generally positive, but it criticized the lighting. The review stated that the party committee should have been more jolly, and that the best among the actors was Egil Hjorth-Jenssen, who "stands in a special class as the chief 'rabbit.'"

Music
The song St. Hans vals (Saint John's Waltz) was written for the film by Gunnar Sønstevold. It was recorded by the Maj Sønstevold Ensemble in Oslo on April 16, 1947. The song was released on a 78 rpm disc (Musica A-8515).

References

Norwegian black-and-white films
1947 films
Films based on Norwegian novels
Norwegian drama films
1940s Norwegian-language films
1947 drama films
Films directed by Toralf Sandø